Emily Infeld (born March 21, 1990) is an American long-distance runner. She regularly competes in the 5000 m and 10,000 m distances during her professional career; in her college career she regularly competed in the 4 × 800 meter relay and 1500 m on up to 5000 m.

During her collegiate career at Georgetown University, she was the 3000 m 2012 NCAA Indoor Championships winner. She also had runner-up placings in NCAA competition in cross country running and outdoor track (1500 m and 5000 m).

During her professional career, Infeld has represented her country at major international championships including the 2013 IAAF World Cross Country Championships (21st overall aiding the US team to 4th), the 2015 World Championships in Athletics (3rd), the 2016 Summer Olympics (11th), and the 2017 World Championships in Athletics (6th).

Running career

Early career
Raised in University Heights, Ohio, Infeld attended Beaumont School. She was interested in track and field from an early age and initially took up racewalking after being turned down for the Cleveland AAU track team, which took on her older sister, Maggie. While at high school she moved back into running and won four straight state titles in the 800 meters.

College
She went on to attend Georgetown University and began to compete for their Georgetown Hoyas collegiate team, following in the footsteps of her older sister. In her first major competition for the team, she was eighth in the 1500 meters at the 2009 NCAA Women's Outdoor Track and Field Championships. She established herself among the country's top college distance runners with a runner-up finish at the NCAA Women's Division I Cross Country Championship in 2010.

She placed eighth in the 3000 meters at the 2010 NCAA Outdoor Championships but had greater success the following year. She was fourth at the 2011 NCAA Cross Country, leading Georgetown to the team title. She placed second in the 5000 meters at the NCAA Outdoor Championships that year. Her best collegiate performances came in 2012 when she was a double indoor Big East Conference champion (3000 m and mile run) and was the 3000 m winner at the NCAA Indoor Championships. Turning to the outdoor season, she was runner-up in the 1500 m at the NCAA Outdoor Championships behind Katie Flood. Her personal bests in the 3000 m and 5000 m were school records.

Professional

Early career (2012–2015)
Infeld originally intended to pursue graduate school at Georgetown University for the 2012–2013 academic year; however, she was not feeling fully invested in her graduate program, and with her college coach Chris Miltenberg and many training partners moving elsewhere, she decided to turn pro joining Kimbia Athletics (officially announced October 2012) and move to Portland, Oregon to work under coach Jerry Schumacher at the Bowerman Track Club. She began training alongside American Olympians Shalane Flanagan and Kara Goucher  where she struggled to adapt to the strict training schedule at first and missed parts of the 2013 season. However, she placed 4th at the 2013 USA Cross Country Championships to qualify for the 2013 IAAF World Cross Country Championships and placed 21st – a key member of the United States fourth place team. In November 2013, she was diagnosed with a stress fracture in her sacrum on the left side, and again had to take time off from running. After taking months off, she was beginning to progress with her career again, but in December 2014, she suffered another stress fracture of the sacrum; this time on the right side. She was unable to run on foot again until about 6 weeks before her first race back from injury on May 3, 2015.

2015
After significant struggles in her early professional career, Infeld made an astonishing comeback in 2015. She set personal records in 2015, running her first race of the year in 31:38.71 for the 10,000 meters in May and 15:07.19 for the 5000 m in June surpassing both the qualifying standards outlined in 2015 World Championships in Athletics qualification standards and Athletics at the 2016 Summer Olympics – Qualification. Further progressing in 2015, she placed third in the 10,000 m at the 2015 USA Outdoor Track and Field Championships, her highest ever national finish up to that date, gaining selection for the national team alongside Molly Huddle and fellow Bowerman Track Club athlete Shalane Flanagan. At the 2015 Beijing World Championships on August 24, Infeld kicked hard for the bronze medal in the 10,000 m, catching a slowing Huddle at the line. All three USA team members (Infeld, Huddle, and Flanagan), were within seconds of one another. The heat and humidity were factors affecting the evolution of the race, slowing the pace of most or all competitors.

2016
On February 20, 2016, Infeld finished third in the Millrose Games women's indoor 5000 meters in 15:00.91, behind Betsy Saina and Molly Huddle. Infeld placed second in the 10,000 m behind Molly Huddle at the 2016 United States Olympic Trials (track and field) to qualify for Athletics at the 2016 Summer Olympics with Marielle Hall. In the Olympics 10000 m event she placed 11th in 31:26.94. The weather conditions were ideal for a fast race, where at least the top 6 competitors performed close to their best expectations that day, and many personal records were set including a World Record of 29:17 by Almaz Ayana. The Olympics USA team was spread apart by more than 2 minutes. Infeld's fellow team member, Molly Huddle, was well ahead and had one of her best performances establishing a PR of 30:13 and placing 6th. Marielle Hall was far behind in 32:39 for 33rd.

On September 3 at the 5th Avenue Mile, held on the roads in New York, Infeld placed 16th in an official time of 4:28, setting a new road PR.

2017
On March 11, 2017, Infeld started the year off well with a 2nd-place finish in the U.S. 15k Road Championship in a time of 49:42. As a preparation for the 2017 USA Outdoor Track and Field Championships, Infeld participated part way through the Payton Jordan Invitational 10,000m held on May 5.

When it came time for the 2017 USA Outdoor Track and Field Championships on June 22, Infeld placed 2nd in the 10,000m establishing a new PR of 31:22.67 at the 2017 World Championships in London.

In preparation for the World Championships, Infeld travelled to St. Moritz Switzerland to train and also competed in two events during her stay in Europe. Her first event was in Lucerne Switzerland on July 11 where she ran the 3000m and placed 5th in 8:55.41. Her second event was a 5000 m run in Huesden Belgium on July 22 where she ran close to her training partner, Shalane Flanagan, and then led the race for the last 2.5k with the exception of being passed at the very end, placing second. She established a PR of 14:56.33 that day.

At the 2017 World Championships in London on August 5, Infeld placed 6th where she led the USA team in a time of 31:20.45, establishing another PR in the 10,000m despite the leaders starting off with a significantly slow first 3k. Similar to the 2015 World Championships, all three USA team members (this time Infeld, Huddle, and Sisson) were within seconds of one another. The first 2k of the race was slow (6:48 for the leader where 1k was 3:30 for the leader), and it wasn't until after 3k-4k with Almaz Ayana making a decisive move where the large pack of runners started break up. Molly Huddle was leading the USA team for the first 7-8k, while Infeld showed greater strength particularly in last 1k in an attempt to overcome the local pack of other competitors just in front of the USA team. Infeld succeeded, falling just short of only one of those competitors in the local pack, Susan Krumins, who also surpassed Infeld at the end in the Huesden Belgium 5000 m. The remaining runners had a significant lead ahead of the local pack starting at 6k, which included Almaz Ayana who lapped all competitors except the three who placed behind her. Infeld's first 5k was 16:08 and her last 5k was 15:12, showing significant potential for another PR in the future.

In September, Infeld attended two 1 mile races in New York State. At the Long Island Mile on September 6, Infeld placed 4th in a time of 4:30.78 setting a new outdoor track PR. Four days later, on September 10, at the 5th Avenue Mile held on the roads in New York City, Infeld placed 17th in a very competitive field in an official time of 4:31 (rounded up; 4:30.3 unofficially).

2018
Infeld started her 2018 season with a win at the 2018 USA Cross Country Championships in 33:18.7 (3:19.9/km), followed by Molly Seidel in 33:22.1, Stephanie Bruce in 33:34.1, her teammate Courtney Frerichs 33:55.1, Emily Durgin in 33:56.9, and Susan Tanui in 34:39.0; the six qualified for Team USA at 2018 NACAC Cross Country Championships in La Libertad, El Salvador on February 17, 2018.

2019
Infeld struggled with a number of complex injury-related obstacles for many months since early 2018, but was on a smooth trajectory in 2019 about 2 months prior to her departure at the World class Beach to Beacon 10k event. After about 18 months of not competing, on Aug 3rd Infeld surprisingly placed 4th in 32:39 at the Beach to Beacon 10k. Continuing her trend for the year in the 10k, on October 14, Infeld placed 3rd in the Boston 10k for Women in a time of 32:14. On November 2, Infeld placed 3rd in the NYRR 5k in a time of 15:47.

2020
Infeld started the 2020 year on the track. Notably, this was her first track race in about 2 years. At the Husky Classic on February 14, Infeld placed 1st in the 3000m in a meet record time of 8:48.73. On February 27, Infeld ran a 5000m 14:51.91 PR at the Boston University Last Chance Invitational.

2021
On February 20, Infeld competed in the 10,000m on the outdoor track for the first time in years. Despite this, Infeld ran the 10,000m in a time of 31:08.57 for 4th place in San Juan Capistrano, CA. However, her build-up efforts did not shine as hoped for on the day of the Olympic trials. On June 26, 2021, on an unusually warm day, Infeld ran the 10,000-meter final of the Olympic trials finishing in eighth place with a time of 32:19. She stated that "[It was] probably one of my worst races. It's never a fun place to have one of your worst races at the trials. I feel like I'm fitter than that race showcased."

Personal records

International championship qualifier record

USA Cross Country Championships, USATF Indoor Championships, USATF Outdoor Championships, and US Olympic Trials

International championship record

Personal life

Stalking
Beginning April 2018, and for three years thereafter (with the exception of 16 months within that time starting September/October 2018 after a protection order), Infield was stalked, which resulted in her fear, stress, and the hiding of her location. This harassment had a significant impact on Infeld's personal life and professional career. The harasser was eventually arrested and charged in June 2021 by a U.S. Attorney with felony cyberstalking and interstate violation of a protection order. On October 15, 2021. She married long-term boyfriend Max Randolph in San Jose Del Cabo, Mexico.

References

External links

February 14, 2019 Carrie catches up with 2016 Olympian Emily Infeld! They discuss her recent injury and surgery, the rollercoaster ride of doctors and therapists, her cross training habits, and much more Carrie Tollefson

Living people
1990 births
Sportspeople from Cuyahoga County, Ohio
Track and field athletes from Ohio
American female long-distance runners
American female middle-distance runners
Georgetown Hoyas women's track and field athletes
World Athletics Championships medalists
World Athletics Championships athletes for the United States
Olympic track and field athletes of the United States
Athletes (track and field) at the 2016 Summer Olympics
People from University Heights, Ohio
21st-century American women